Clostridium sporogenes is a species of Gram-positive bacteria that belongs to the genus Clostridium. Like other strains of Clostridium, it is an anaerobic, rod-shaped bacterium that produces oval, subterminal endospores and is commonly found in soil.  Unlike Clostridium botulinum, it does not produce the botulinum neurotoxins.  In colonized animals, it has a mutualistic rather than pathogenic interaction with the host.

It is being investigated as a way to deliver cancer-treating drugs to tumours in patients. C. sporogenes is often used as a surrogate for C. botulinum when testing the efficacy of commercial sterilisation.

Clostridium sporogenes colonizes the human gastrointestinal tract, but is only present in a subset of the population; in the intestine, it uses tryptophan to synthesize indole and subsequently  (IPA) – a type of auxin (plant hormone) – which serves as a potent neuroprotective antioxidant within the human body and brain. IPA is an even more potent scavenger of hydroxyl radicals than melatonin. Similar to melatonin but unlike other antioxidants, it scavenges radicals without subsequently generating reactive and pro-oxidant intermediate compounds. C. sporogenes is the only species of bacteria known to synthesize 3-indolepropionic acid in vivo at levels which are subsequently detectable in the blood stream of the host.

References

External links
 Type strain of Clostridium sporogenes at BacDive -  the Bacterial Diversity Metadatabase

sporogenes
Gram-positive bacteria
Bacteria described in 1923